Remainder is a 2015 British-German drama film written and directed by Omer Fast, based on the 2005 novel of the same name by Tom McCarthy. It stars Tom Sturridge, Cush Jumbo, Ed Speleers, and Arsher Ali. The film was screened in the Panorama section at the 66th Berlin International Film Festival. It received generally positive reviews from critics.

Plot
Tom receives a settlement of €8.5 million after losing his memories in an accident. Outside, he asks for change. Later, at a party, Tom experiences a vision of a past memory. He remembers the exact smells, sounds, and sights he experienced when walking down the stairwell of a flat, including running into a child. Tom decides to use his money to reenact this exact memory. He hires a compliant assistant named Naz. The workers he hires to build his memories describe him as a perfectionist.

Tom ends his relationship with close friends. He contracts a man named Christopher who he had met at a local phonebooth. Several days later, however, Christopher is tased and shot dead. Tom decides to play Christopher in a reenactment of his death. He uses a real taser despite Naz's protests. Tom next decides to reenact a bank robbery after witnessing the torturing and killing of a suspect. He hires an ex-convict with experience in heists. The man tells Tom that robberies require lots of choreography and that his crew would usually rehearse before a heist. With this in mind, Tom decides to have his cast rob an actual bank without telling them beforehand.

Naz tells Tom that they will have to murder the cast after completing the heist. The real robbery goes awry when one of the cast members is accidentally killed. Tom shoots the rest of his crew. He notices that one of the witnesses is the same child from his first reenactment. He runs into Catherine, a close friend he had argued with, and takes a suitcase from her that he thinks is his. Outside, Tom braces himself for the impact of the same accident shown at the beginning of the film.

Cast
 Tom Sturridge as Tom
 Cush Jumbo as Catherine Sullivan
 Ed Speleers as Greg
 Arsher Ali as Naz
 Nicholas Farrell as Daubenay
 Jumayn Hunter as Christopher
 Shaun Prendergast as Dr. Merril
 Adrian Schiller as Dr. Trevellian

Reception

References

External links
 

2015 films
2015 drama films
2010s mystery drama films
English-language German films
British mystery drama films
German mystery drama films
2015 directorial debut films
Films about amnesia
Films based on British novels
Films shot in London
2010s English-language films
2010s British films
2010s German films